Colverde is a comune in the province of Como, in Lombardy, that was formed in May 2014 from fusion of comuni di Drezzo, Gironico and Parè. 
A referendum to create this comune was held on 1 December 2013 in the former comuni: the results were 78% yes and 22% no.

References

Cities and towns in Lombardy